Orlando de Azevedo Viana, commonly known as Orlando Pingo de Ouro ("golden drop") (December 4, 1923 - August 4, 2004) was a Brazilian footballer, who played as a left midfielder.

Football career 
Orlando began his career at Náutico and defended the colors of Fluminense playing between 1945 and 1954, scoring 186 goals in 310 matches for Flu, making him top scorer in the 1946 Carioca Championship and the 1952 Rio Cup

His debut for Fluminense at Laranjeiras Stadium was in the 2–1 victory over America FC on August 5, 1945, having scored the winning goal in the 38th minute of the second half, against 13,113 paying fans, plus the tricolor members present at the Laranjeiras Stadium that afternoon.

His nickname was given after scoring 4 goals on a rainy day against Bonsucesso FC, with journalist José Araújo writing the day after, that Orlando "looked like a drop of water present all over the lawn and shining as if it were gold".

Still for Fluminense, Orlando was champion of the 1948 Municipal Tournament (when he scored in the final against CR Vasco da Gama with a bicycle goal), having been the top scorer in this competition with 12 goals, and champion in Rio in 1946 and 1951. He would be champion also the 1952 Rio Cup and the Torneio Inicio of 1954 and 1956.

Orlando is the biggest tricolor scorer against the traditional rival America, with 15 goals, 13 for the Campeonato Carioca and 2 for the Municipal Tournament.

For the Brazil, he was a South American champion in 1949, when he played his 3 games for the seleção canarinho, scoring 2 goals (1 in each game) in the victories over Colombia(5–0) and Peru (7–1), also participating with great performance of the victory in the final against Uruguay (5–1).

Short and slight, he was fast and very intelligent, knowing how to move very well and, therefore, always putting himself in the position to score many goals, which he did consecrating himself as the second highest scorer in the history of Fluminense FC.

He moved to Santos FC and, in a few months, he was playing at Clube Atlético Mineiro, in Minas Gerais, where he had to live with a drama: the triple taboo. Atlético led the number of state titles, had more achievements than their rivals Cruzeiro, América Mineiro and Villa Nova, but all their rivals had already been three-time champions, and of the big ones, only the Rooster who did not.

Orlando helped the team, led by Uruguayan Ricardo Díez, to finally break that mark (after 39 championships), by acting with Ubaldo, Amorim, Joel, Afonso, Osvaldo, Zé do Monte, Tomazinho and other beasts on Sunday afternoons in Campo do Sete (as the Independência Stadium was called, currently popularly known as the "Horto trapdoor").

Main titles 

 Fluminense

 Copa Rio: 1952
 Campeonato Carioca: 1946 e 1951
 Torneio Municipal: 1948
 Torneio Início do Campeonato Carioca: 1954 e 1956
 Torneio José de Paula Júnior: 1952
 Copa das Municipalidades do Paraná: 1953
 Taça Benemérito João Lira Filho - (inauguração do estádio do Olaria: 1947 (Fluminense versus Vasco)
 Taça V.C Borba: 1947 (Atlético PR versus Flu)
 Taça Folha da Tarde: 1949 (Internacional-RS versus Flu)
 Taça Casa Nemo: 1949
 Troféu Prefeito Acrisio Moreira da Rocha: 1949 (Fla-Flu)
 Taça Secretário da Viação de Obras Públicas da Bahia: 1951 (Esporte Clube Bahia versus Fluminense)
 Taça Madalena Copello: 1951 (Fla-Flu)
 Taça Desafio: 1954 (Fluminense versus Uberaba)

 Atlético Mineiro

 Seleção Brasileira

 Campeonato Sul-Americano de 1949

References

External links 
 Orlando Pingo de Ouro - Site Terceiro Tempo.

Clube Atlético Mineiro players
Botafogo de Futebol e Regatas players
Santos FC players
Clube Náutico Capibaribe players
Fluminense FC players
2004 deaths
1923 births
Brazilian footballers
Brazil international footballers
Association football midfielders
Sportspeople from Recife